Catherine Fitch is a Canadian actress. She is most noted for her performance as Iris in the 1995 television film Butterbox Babies, for which she won the Gemini Award for Best Supporting Actress in a Television Film or Miniseries at the 10th Gemini Awards in 1996.

Early life and education

Born in Balcarres, Saskatchewan, Fitch was raised in Balcarres and Red Deer, Alberta. She was educated at the University of Calgary and the National Theatre School of Canada.

Career

She has also received two Gemini Award nominations for Supporting or Guest Performance in a Drama Series for her role as Rosemary in This Is Wonderland, and a Canadian Screen Award nomination for Best Supporting Actress in a Comedy Series for Living in Your Car.

Her other roles have included the films South of Wawa, Ordinary Magic, Borrowed Hearts, Bless the Child, Knockaround Guys, You Stupid Man, Away from Her, Picture Day and Cardinals, and the television series Street Legal, Emily of New Moon, Slings & Arrows and Murdoch Mysteries, as well as roles on stage.

Filmography

Film

Television

References

External links

20th-century Canadian actresses
21st-century Canadian actresses
Canadian film actresses
Canadian television actresses
Canadian stage actresses
Best Supporting Actress in a Television Film or Miniseries Canadian Screen Award winners
Actresses from Saskatchewan
University of Calgary alumni
National Theatre School of Canada alumni
Year of birth missing (living people)
Living people